Yuantang is language game spoken by Hakka speakers at Yuantang, a village in southern China. It is also known as the snake language.

Rules
Example : 食饭 → 手习花散 [sit fan] → [siu jit fa san]; eat (rice) → hand + learn + flower + separation.

Clearly, the words 食 and 饭 are each split into two sounds, the initial and the rime, thus 食 [sit] is made up of the initial of 手 [s] and the rime of 习 [it], and similarly, 饭 [fan] is [f] from 花 and [an] from 散. This is similar to the traditional Chinese practice of representing sounds by two characters known as fanqie.

This practice also resembles Jin, another Sinitic language, in its process of splitting a monosyllabic word into two syllables. A similar process is also found in Mandarin.

History
There is no solid evidence for the original of Yuantang. But it is believed to be an invention of a local intellectual in Qing dynasty.

Hakka Chinese
Language games
Chinese language